Lane Murray was an educator who helped found the correctional education system in prisons in Texas.

Windham School District 
In 1969, the Texas Board of Corrections created Windham School District, the country's first correctional school district. Murray became the first superintendent of the newly established Windham School District at a time when others were skeptical prison education would decrease prisoners' recidivism rates.

References 

American educators